Dactylorhiza majalis, the broad-leaved marsh orchid,  is a terrestrial Eurasian orchid.

Subspecies include: western marsh orchid (Dactylorhiza majalis subsp. occidentalis), southern marsh orchid (Dactylorhiza majalis subsp. praetermissa), Hebridean marsh orchid (Dactylorhiza majalis subsp. ebudensis), and narrow-leaved marsh orchid (Dactylorhiza majalis subsp. traunsteinerioides).

The broad-leaved marsh orchid grows mainly in nitrogen-poor marsh areas that consist of several plant communities. More rarely, it is found in fens. Its flowering period begins at lower elevations as early as the beginning of May and ends in higher elevations at the end of July. The lowest blossoms usually open even before the stem has reached its full height.

Description

Three to eight dark spotted leaves are distributed on the stem, which is hollow. The upper leaves are increasingly smaller and more lanceolate. The bracts are about as long as the blossom and cover it before it blooms. The seven to forty blossoms are colored purplish red, rarely light pink or white. The lateral tepals of the external circle of the perianth stand obliquely or vertically upright. They are 7 to 12 mm (¼ to ½ in) long and 2.5 to 5 mm (⅛ to 3⁄16 in) wide. The middle tepal is smaller and forms a "helmet" together with the two lateral tepals of the internal circle. These are 6 to 11 mm (¼ to 7⁄16 in) long. The trilobate lip is 5 to 10 mm (3⁄16 to ⅜ in) long and 7 to 14 mm (¼ to 9⁄16 in) wide. The shape and pattern of the lips are variable. In the lighter central area of the lip the markings are made up of lines, streaks, or dots. The spur is bent slightly downwards and is not quite as long as the ovary. The tuber has a palmate division and an irregular shape.

The broad-leaved marsh orchid has a karyotype of four sets of twenty chromosomes (2n = 4x = 80) and a genome size of 14.24 Gbp (2C). The seed of this orchid contains no endosperm for the embryo. Therefore, germination can take place only by means of infection with a root fungus (mycorrhiza).

Taxonomy
In 1828 Ludwig Reichenbach described the broad-leaved marsh orchid as Orchis majalis. The name became the basionym after Peter Francis Hunt and Victor Samuel Summerhayes transferred the species to the genus Dactylorhiza in 1965. Sometimes the name Dactylorhiza fistulosa is used, but since this description is not valid, the name cannot be used despite its earlier publication in 1794 as Orchis fistulosa.

Many synonyms have been published:

Orchis majalis Rchb.
Dactylorchis majalis (Rchb.) Verm
Orchis baltica (Klinge) A.Fuchs
Dactylorchis baltica (Klinge) Verm.
Dactylorhiza baltica (Klinge) N.I.Orlova
Orchis longifolia Neuman
Dactylorhiza ebudensis (Wief. ex R.M.Bateman & Denholm) P.Delforge
Orchis francis-drucei Wilmott
Dactylorhiza francis-drucei (Wilmott) Aver.
Orchis kerryensis Wilmott
Dactylorchis kerryensis (Wilmott) Verm.
Dactylorhiza kerryensis (Wilmott) P.F.Hunt & Summerh.
Dactylorhiza parvimajalis D.Tyteca & Gathoye
Orchis occidentalis (Pugsley) Wilmott
Dactylorchis occidentalis (Pugsley) Verm.
Dactylorhiza occidentalis (Pugsley) P.Delforge
Orchis sphagnicola Höppner
Dactylorchis sphagnicola (Höppner) Verm.
Dactylorhiza sphagnicola (Höppner) Aver.
Dactylorchis hoeppneri (A.Fuchs) Verm.
Orchis hoeppneri (A.Fuchs) Höppner ex Verm.
Dactylorchis deweveri Verm.
Dactylorhiza deweveri (Verm.) Soó
Dactylorhiza hoeppneri (A.Fuchs) Soó
Dactylorhiza sennia Vollmar
Orchis traunsteinerioides (Pugsley) Pugsley
Dactylorchis traunsteinerioides (Pugsley) Verm.
Dactylorhiza traunsteinerioides (Pugsley) Landwehr

Subspecies and varieties

Many names have been proposed at the subspecies, variety and form levels, but as of June 2014 only the following are recognized:
Dactylorhiza majalis subsp. baltica (Klinge) H.Sund. – Finland, Germany, the Baltic Republics, Russia, Siberia, Kazakhstan
Dactylorhiza majalis subsp. ebudensis (Wief. ex R.M.Bateman & Denholm) M.R.Lowe – Outer Hebrides of Scotland
Dactylorhiza majalis var. francis-drucei (Wilmott) R.M.Bateman & Denholm – Scotland
Dactylorhiza majalis var. kerryensis (Wilmott) R.M.Bateman & Denholm – western Ireland
Dactylorhiza majalis subsp. majalis – widespread across much of Europe from Spain to Russia
Dactylorhiza majalis subsp. occidentalis (Pugsley) P.D.Sell – Britain and Ireland
Dactylorhiza majalis subsp. sphagnicola (Höppner) H.A.Pedersen & Hedrén – Scandinavia, Germany, France, Belgium, Netherlands 
Dactylorhiza majalis subsp. traunsteinerioides (Pugsley) R.M.Bateman & Denholm – Britain and Ireland

Hybrids
The broad-leaved marsh orchid hybridizes quite commonly with other species of its genus.
Dactylorhiza × aschersoniana (Dactylorhiza incarnata × D. majalis)
Dactylorhiza × braunii (Dactylorhiza fuchsii × D. majalis)
Dactylorhiza × dufftiana (Dactylorhiza traunsteineri × D. majalis)
Dactylorhiza × godferyana (Dactylorhiza praetermissa × D. majalis)
Dactylorhiza × kuehnensis (Dactylorhiza ruthei × D. majalis)
Dactylorhiza × townsendiana (Dactylorhiza maculata × D. majalis)
Dactylorhiza × rupertii (Dactylorhiza sambucina × D. majalis)

More rarely, hybrids with other genera (intergeneric hybrids) occur.
×Dactyloglossum drucei (Coeloglossum viride × Dactylorhiza majalis)
×Dactylodenia lebrunii (Dactylorhiza majalis × Gymnadenia conopsea)

Range
Dactylorhiza majalis is widespread across much of Europe and north-central Asia, from Spain and Ireland to Siberia and Kazakhstan.

In Germany the broad-leaved marsh orchid is widespread but with several gaps. In many places, especially from western to northern Germany, it is extinct.

In Switzerland it is also quite widespread. A significant gap is found south of the Aar between Aarau and Lake Neuchâtel.

Conservation
Although the broad-leaved marsh orchid is commonly found in some regions, it is nevertheless protected as an orchid.

As with many marsh plants, the numbers of this species have been dwindling for quite some time. The main causes are the entry of nitrogen via fertilizer, drying out of the habitat, and intensive conversion to pasture. The broad-leaved marsh orchid does not react so sensitively to changes in its habitat as for example the early marsh orchid, Dactylorhiza incarnata. It is usually the last of the native orchids to disappear. This tolerance makes it a still relatively common species.

References

External links

 Den virtuella floran Distribution

majalis
Orchids of Europe
Orchids of Asia
Plants described in 1828